Donald Tatenda Tiripano (born 17 March 1988) is a Zimbabwean cricketer, who plays for the national team. He is a right-arm fast bowler and tail-ended batsman.

Domestic career
He was the leading run-scorer in the 2017–18 Logan Cup for Mountaineers, with 678 runs in eight matches. He was the leading wicket-taker in the 2018–19 Logan Cup, with 25 dismissals in six matches. In December 2020, he was selected to play for the Mountaineers in the 2020–21 Logan Cup.

International career
He was named in Zimbabwe squad for Afghanistan tour of Zimbabwe. He made his One Day International (ODI) debut at Queens Sports Club against Afghanistan where he took 2/51 in overs as Zimbabwe won by 6 wickets.

In his third ODI, Tiripano took 5/63 in 10 overs against Afghanistan at Queens Sports Club  was not enough to clinch victory for Zimbabwe as they lost 100 runs. He took wickets of Javed Ahmadi, Usman Ghani, Shafiqullah, Mirwais Ashraf and Aftab Alam.

He was named in Zimbabwean Test squad for one-off Test against South Africa and made his Test debut at Harare Sports Club in August 2014 where he took scored unbeaten 15 and then with bat and took two wickets of Dean Elgar and another debutant Dane Piedt.

He made his Twenty20 International debut for Zimbabwe against Afghanistan on 8 January 2016.

Personal life
Tiripano is married to Chipo Mugeri-Tiripano, who has captained the Zimbabwean women's team. They have a daughter together.

References

External links
 

1988 births
Living people
Zimbabwe One Day International cricketers
Zimbabwe Twenty20 International cricketers
Cricketers from Mutare
Zimbabwean cricketers
Zimbabwe Test cricketers
Mountaineers cricketers
Zimbabwe Select XI cricketers